Tung is a village in the Chungthang subdivision of North Sikkim district in the north Indian state of Sikkim. The Ministry of Home Affairs has given it a geographical code of 260863.

References

Cities and towns in Mangan district